Chanda Lalit Mohan High School is a co-ed secondary school located in Panchita (Chanda Bazar) in Bongaon sub-division in the North 24 Parganas district, state of West Bengal, in India. It was established in 1956 as a Junior High School for grades V to VIII. Then it was upgraded to High School i.e. Class IX and Class X was added. Class XI and Class XII were added in June 2006. The student of class XI & XII student may take arts or Humanities stream for their higher studies. Subjects include Bengali, English, Education, Geography, History, Mathematics, Philosophy and Political Science.

History 
The School was founded in 1956 by the Lalit Mohan the reason the school name is Chanda Lalit Mohan High School.

Foundation Years 
The present Panchita (Chandabazar) address where the school is situated, but the school is originally located for Chanda a place beside Panchita. The school was changed to Panchita for school playground issue.

Examination coordinating school 
The board examination of class X OR XII is held ever year for other school, organisation and selection is done by the board of school service commission. The school is also been selected for government service examination held by many other government organisation.

Courses 
The courses offered by school till class X are regulated by West Bengal Board of Secondary Education. In class XI & XII course offered as subjects include Bengali, English, Education, Geography, History, Mathematics, Philosophy and Political Science by school and regulated by West Bengal Council of Higher Secondary Education.

Campus 
The classes are spread over three floors across two buildings. There are over 18 classrooms, 1 laboratories, 1 staff room, 1 common room, 1 headmaster office

Sports and Festivals 
The school has facilities for playing sports like: Cricket, Football, Volleyball and Carom board.
A sports day is organised, every year in January. Students of the school, compete in various track and field events, on this day, amidst huge audiences from all over the local area.

Photo Gallery

References

External links
 Chanda Lalit mohan High School in West Bengal High School of Secondary Education
 Chanda Lalit mohan High School in  West Bengal School Education Department.
 Chanda Lalit mohan High School in Dharmapukuria.
 Chanda Lalit mohan High School Facebook Link to connect.

High schools and secondary schools in West Bengal
Schools in North 24 Parganas district
Educational institutions established in 1956
1956 establishments in West Bengal